The Journal of Plant Physiology is a peer-reviewed scientific journal covering all areas of plant physiology. It was established in 1909 as Zeitschrift für Botanik and renamed Zeitschrift für Pflanzenphysiologie in 1965, before assuming its present name in 1984. It is published by Elsevier. The editors-in-chief are Herbert J. Kronzucker (University of Melbourne), Quan-Sheng Qiu (Lanzhou University), and Uwe Sonnewald (Friedrich-Alexander University Erlangen-Nuremberg). According to the Journal Citation Reports, the journal has an impact factor of 3.549, and a 5-year impact factor of 4.164, as of 2021. In addition, it has a CiteScore of 6.0.

References

External links

 Journal of Plant Physiology at SCImago Journal Rank
 Journal of Plant Physiology at Botanical Scientific Journals
 Journal of Plant Physiology (Zeitschrift für Pflanzenphysiologie) at HathiTrust Digital Library

Botany journals
Publications established in 1909
Elsevier academic journals
English-language journals